Tane Dam  is a rockfill dam located in Ishikawa Prefecture in Japan. The dam is used for irrigation. The catchment area of the dam is 2.2 km2. The dam impounds about 16  ha of land when full and can store 1334 thousand cubic meters of water. The construction of the dam was started on 1968 and completed in 1973.

See also
List of dams in Japan

References

Dams in Ishikawa Prefecture